Group C of the EuroBasket 2015 took place between 5 and 10 September 2015. The group played all of its games at Arena Zagreb in Zagreb, Croatia.

The group composed of Croatia, Georgia, Greece, Macedonia, Netherlands and Slovenia. The four best ranked teams advanced to the second round.

Standings

All times are local (UTC+2).

5 September

Georgia v Netherlands
The Dutch led 12 points at one point in the fourth quarter, but Georgia fought back. Robin Smeulders hit the game-winning jump shot with 18 seconds on the clock. It was the first EuroBasket win for the Netherlands since 4 June 1987.

Macedonia v Greece

Croatia v Slovenia

6 September

Netherlands v Macedonia

Slovenia v Georgia

Greece v Croatia

8 September

Slovenia v Netherlands

Georgia v Greece

Croatia v Macedonia

9 September

Greece v Slovenia

Macedonia v Georgia

Netherlands v Croatia

10 September

Slovenia v Macedonia

Georgia v Croatia

Greece v Netherlands

References

External links
Official website

Group C
International basketball competitions hosted by Croatia
2015–16 in Croatian basketball
2015–16 in Dutch basketball
2015–16 in Republic of Macedonia basketball
2015–16 in Slovenian basketball
2015–16 in Greek basketball
2015–16 in Georgian basketball
Sports competitions in Zagreb
September 2015 sports events in Europe
2010s in Zagreb